The GHKL domain (Gyrase, Hsp90, Histidine Kinase, MutL) is an evolutionary conserved protein domain.
   
This family represents the structurally related ATPase domains of histidine kinase, DNA gyrase B and HSP90. This domain is found in several ATP-binding proteins for example: histidine kinase, DNA gyrase B, topoisomerases, heat shock protein HSP90, phytochrome-like ATPases and DNA mismatch repair proteins. More information about this protein can be found at Protein of the Month: DNA Topoisomerase.

Subfamilies
 Histidine kinase related protein, C-terminal

Members 

 BCKDK
 HSP90AA1, HSP90AB1, HSP90B1
 MLH1, MLH3, MORC1, MORC2, MORC3, MORC4
 PDK1, PDK2, PDK3, PDK4
 PMS1, PMS2, PMS2L1, PMS2L11, PMS2L3, PMS4L
 TOP2A, TOP2B
 TRAP1, TRRAP

References

Protein domains